The NHL's Smythe Division was formed in 1974 as part of the Clarence Campbell Conference. The division existed for 19 seasons until 1993. It was named in honour of Conn Smythe, who was a longtime owner, general manager, and head coach in the league. It is the forerunner of the NHL's Northwest Division and Pacific Division.

Division lineups

1974–1976
 Chicago Black Hawks
 Kansas City Scouts
 Minnesota North Stars
 St. Louis Blues
 Vancouver Canucks

Changes from the 1973–74 season
 The Smythe Division is formed as a result of NHL realignment
 The Vancouver Canucks come from the East Division
 The Chicago Black Hawks, Minnesota North Stars, and St. Louis Blues come from the West Division
 The Kansas City Scouts are added as an expansion team

1976–1978
 Chicago Black Hawks
 Colorado Rockies
 Minnesota North Stars
 St. Louis Blues
 Vancouver Canucks

Changes from the 1975–76 season
 The Kansas City Scouts move to Denver, Colorado, to become the Colorado Rockies

1978–1979
 Chicago Black Hawks
 Colorado Rockies
 St. Louis Blues
 Vancouver Canucks

Changes from the 1977–78 season
 The Minnesota North Stars merge with the Cleveland Barons. The new franchise continues as the Minnesota North Stars but assumes the Barons' place in the Adams Division

1979–1981
 Chicago Black Hawks
 Colorado Rockies
 Edmonton Oilers
 St. Louis Blues
 Vancouver Canucks
 Winnipeg Jets

Changes from the 1978–79 season
 The Edmonton Oilers and Winnipeg Jets are granted entry into the NHL from the World Hockey Association (WHA)

1981–1982
 Calgary Flames
 Colorado Rockies
 Edmonton Oilers
 Los Angeles Kings
 Vancouver Canucks

Changes from the 1980–81 season
 The Chicago Black Hawks, St. Louis Blues, and Winnipeg Jets move to the Norris Division
 The Calgary Flames come from the Patrick Division
 The Los Angeles Kings come from the Norris Division

1982–1991
 Calgary Flames
 Edmonton Oilers
 Los Angeles Kings
 Vancouver Canucks
 Winnipeg Jets

Changes from the 1981–82 season
 The Colorado Rockies move to the Patrick Division as the New Jersey Devils
 The Winnipeg Jets come from the Norris Division

1991–1993
 Calgary Flames
 Edmonton Oilers
 Los Angeles Kings
 San Jose Sharks
 Vancouver Canucks
 Winnipeg Jets

Changes from the 1990–91 season
 The San Jose Sharks are added as an expansion team

After the 1992–93 season
The league was reformatted into two conferences with two divisions each:
 Eastern Conference
 Atlantic Division
 Northeast Division
 Western Conference
 Central Division
 Pacific Division

Regular season Division champions
 1975 – Vancouver Canucks (38–32–10, 86 pts)
 1976 – Chicago Black Hawks (32–30–18, 82 pts)
 1977 – St. Louis Blues (32–39–9, 73 pts)
 1978 – Chicago Black Hawks (32–29–19, 83 pts)
 1979 – Chicago Black Hawks (29–36–15, 73 pts)
 1980 – Chicago Black Hawks (34–27–19, 87 pts)
 1981 – St. Louis Blues (45–18–17, 107 pts)
 1982 – Edmonton Oilers (48–17–15, 111 pts)
 1983 – Edmonton Oilers (47–21–12, 106 pts)
 1984 – Edmonton Oilers (57–18–5, 119 pts)
 1985 – Edmonton Oilers (49–20–11, 109 pts)
 1986 – Edmonton Oilers (56–17–7, 119 pts)
 1987 – Edmonton Oilers (50–24–6, 106 pts)
 1988 – Calgary Flames (48–23–9, 105 pts)
 1989 – Calgary Flames (54–17–9, 117 pts)
 1990 – Calgary Flames (42–23–15, 99 pts)
 1991 – Los Angeles Kings (46–24–10, 102 pts)
 1992 – Vancouver Canucks (42–26–12, 96 pts)
 1993 – Vancouver Canucks (46–29–9, 101 pts)

Season results

Playoff Division champions
 1982 – Vancouver Canucks
 1983 – Edmonton Oilers
 1984 – Edmonton Oilers
 1985 – Edmonton Oilers
 1986 – Calgary Flames
 1987 – Edmonton Oilers
 1988 – Edmonton Oilers
 1989 – Calgary Flames
 1990 – Edmonton Oilers
 1991 – Edmonton Oilers
 1992 – Edmonton Oilers
 1993 – Los Angeles Kings

Stanley Cup winners produced
 1984 – Edmonton Oilers
 1985 – Edmonton Oilers
 1987 – Edmonton Oilers
 1988 – Edmonton Oilers
 1989 – Calgary Flames
 1990 – Edmonton Oilers

Presidents' Trophy winners produced
 1986 – Edmonton Oilers
 1987 – Edmonton Oilers
 1988 – Calgary Flames
 1989 – Calgary Flames

Smythe Division titles won by team

References
 NHL History

National Hockey League divisions